Heikeopsis arachnoides is a species of the genus Heikeopsis first described by Manning and Holthuis in 1986. These crabs are native to Japan. They typically live in the sand 15-130m below the surface of water. Heikeopsis arachnoides also lives in Taiwan.

References

Crabs
Crustaceans described in 1986